Kristine Kay Jepson (28 July 1962 – 21 April 2017) was an American mezzo-soprano.

Jepson was one of four children born to Magnus Jepson and Dorothy Jepson, and the only daughter among the siblings.  She grew up in Onawa, Iowa, and graduated from West Monona High School.  She took her university degree in music at Morningside College, where her teachers included Harlan Buss.  Jepson later studied music at Indiana University, with a focus on opera, and earned a Master of Arts degree.

Jepson made her role debut at New York City Opera in September 1998.  At the Metropolitan Opera, she sang the role of Ascanio in the company's première production of Berlioz's Benvenuto Cellini.  She sang in the first performance of Franz Liszt's oratorio St. Stanislaus in May 2003, with the Cincinnati May Festival.

Jepson premièred the role of Kitty Oppenheimer in the first performances of John Adams's Doctor Atomic at the San Francisco Opera in October 2005.  Her other work in contemporary opera included performances in Jake Heggie's Dead Man Walking, as Sister Helen Prejean, at San Francisco Opera and at the Theater an der Wien.

Jepson died of cancer on 21 April 2017, age 54.

Album appearances
 John Williams Trumpet Concerto Featuring Arturo Sandoval – A Long Way; Ronald Feldman, conductor (Denouement Records)
 Liszt: St. Stanislaus conducted by James Conlon
 A Night at the Opera conducted by Charles Rosekrans
 Bel Canto, with Renee Fleming; Patrick Summers, conductor (Decca)
 Berlioz: Benvenuto Cellini (live performance; James Levine, conductor)

References

External links
 Official Kristine Jepson webpage
 Biography of Kristine Jepson at Denouement Records
 Interview with Jepson about her role in Dead Man Walking with Robert Wilder Blue
 Francisco Salazar, 'Obituary: Remembering Mezzo-Soprano Kristine Jepson'  Opera Wire blog, 21 April 2017
 'Amerikaanse mezzosopraan Kristine Jepson overleden (54)', Opera Nederland blog, 21 April 2017

1962 births
2017 deaths
Indiana University alumni
American operatic mezzo-sopranos
Singers from Iowa
20th-century American women opera singers
21st-century American women opera singers